Graham Morgan may refer to:
 Graham Morgan (nursing administrator)
 Graham Morgan (drummer)